Butyrki is a rural locality (a selo) and the administrative center of Butyrskoye Rural Settlement, Repyovsky District, Voronezh Oblast, Russia. The population was 1,103 as of 2010. There are 12 streets.

Geography 
Butyrki is located 3 km southwest of Repyovka (the district's administrative centre) by road. Repyovka is the nearest rural locality.

References 

Rural localities in Repyovsky District